For Adults Only (1971) is the thirteenth comedy album by Bill Cosby. It was recorded at the International Hotel which is now the Westgate Las Vegas Resort & Casino. The title For Adults Only was also used for a 1959 Pearl Bailey LP (Roulette R–25016).

Track listing
Las Vegas/Mirror Over My Bed – 3:01
Why Beat on Your Wife – 4:33
Bill Cosby Fights Back – 7:29
Be Good to Your Wives – 5:38
Masculinity at Its Finest – 9:28
The Cost of an Egg – 3:02
Bill’s Two Daughters – 7:24
Wallie, Wallie – 3:45

Later pressings split tracks one and two:
Las Vegas – 1:11
Mirror Over My Bed – 2:00

References

1971 albums
Bill Cosby live albums
Stand-up comedy albums
Spoken word albums by American artists
Live spoken word albums
MCA Records live albums
1970s comedy albums
Albums recorded at Westgate Las Vegas